Joseph Henry Green (1 November 1791 – 13 December 1863) (72 years) was an English surgeon who became the literary executor of Samuel Taylor Coleridge.

Life
Green was the only son of Joseph Green, a prosperous merchant, and was born at the house over his father's office in London Wall. His mother was Frances Cline, sister of Henry Cline, the surgeon. At the age of fifteen he went to Germany and studied for three years, his mother accompanying him. He was then apprenticed at the College of Surgeons to his uncle, Henry Cline, and followed the practice at St. Thomas's Hospital. While still a pupil he married, on 25 May 1813, Anne Eliza Hammond, daughter of a surgeon, and sister of a class-fellow.

On 1 December 1815 he received the diploma of the College of Surgeons, and set up in surgical practice in Lincoln's Inn Fields, where he remained until his retirement to the country. In 1813 he had been appointed demonstrator of anatomy (unpaid) at St. Thomas's Hospital. In the autumn of 1817 he went to Berlin to take a private course of instruction in philosophy with Karl Wilhelm Ferdinand Solger, to whom he had been recommended by Ludwig Tieck in London. He had already met Samuel Taylor Coleridge, who came to meet Tieck more than once at Green's house.

In 1820 he was elected surgeon to St. Thomas's Hospital, on the death of his cousin, Henry Cline the younger. In 1824 he became professor of anatomy at the College of Surgeons,  delivering four annual courses of twelve lectures on comparative anatomy, using the textbook of Carl Gustav Carus. In 1825 he was elected Fellow of the Royal Society. In the same year he became professor of anatomy to the Royal Academy, then located at Somerset House, where he lectured a year on anatomy in its relation to the fine arts. He retired from this post in 1852. From 1818 he had shared the lectureship first on anatomy and then on surgery at St. Thomas's with Sir Astley Cooper, who retired in 1825, and wished to assign his share of the lectures to his two nephews, Bransby Cooper and Charles Aston Key. Green, who had paid Cooper £1,000 for his own half share, acquiesced, but the hospital authorities did not, whereupon Sir Astley started lectures in connection with Guy's Hospital, which had up to that time sent its pupils to the medical school of St. Thomas's.

On the establishment of King's College in 1830, Green accepted the chair of surgery. He had a reputation, especially in lithotomy, for which he always used Cline's gorget.

Coleridgean
Green met Coleridge in June 1817. A group calling themselves the "Friends of German Literature" invited Tieck, and they gathered at Green's house in Lincoln's Inn Fields. Through James Gillman, Green with Tieck and Henry Crabb Robinson visited Coleridge at Highgate.

Green over the years spent much time in conversation with Coleridge, and in his Poetical Works, Coleridge inserted two pieces of verse by Green (Pickering's ed. of 1847, vol. ii.), a tribute to friendship. Green was to be his literary executor, and he was so named in Coleridge's will. He was to dispose of manuscripts and books for the benefit of the family; but as many of the books (with annotations) would be necessary for the carrying out of another part of Green's executory duties, namely the publication of a system of Coleridgean philosophy, Green was asked, in so many words, to purchase the books himself, which he did. They were later widely dispersed, in the British Museum, a large number in the possession of Coleridge's descendants, and many others in private hands, both in the United Kingdom and in the United States. Accused in 1854 by Clement Mansfield Ingleby in Notes and Queries of withholding from publication works which Coleridge had left more or less ready for the press, Green wrote to explain what it was that he held in trust from Coleridge.

In the same year that Coleridge died (1834), Green's father also died and left him a large fortune. He then accepted Coleridge's legacy as an obligation. In 1836 he gave up his private practice in Lincoln's Inn Fields, and lived for the rest of his life at Mount House, near Barnet. Green's house in Hadley is now home to Mount House School.  He resigned also in 1837 his chair at King's College, but retained for seventeen years longer (until 1852) the surgeoncy to St. Thomas's Hospital, and a share of the lectures on surgery for part of that time.

With a view to a Coleridgean synthesis, he undertook a course of reading, revived his knowledge of Greek, learned Hebrew, and worked on Sanskrit. An introduction by him to the Confessions of an Inquiring Spirit is prefixed to the edition of 1849.

Later life

In 1835 the council of the College of Surgeons had chosen him for life into their body; he was elected a member of the court of examiners in 1846 (also a life appointment), and twice filled the office of president of the college (1849–50 and 1858-9).

In 1851, he served as a Juror [i.e. for selecting the most significant or important exhibits] during "The Great Exhibition", his area of expertise being surgical instruments and equipment.

In 1853 he was made D.C.L. at Oxford, on the occasion of Lord Derby's installation as chancellor. The General Medical Council having been established by the Medical Act of 1858, Green became the representative on it of the College of Surgeons. Two years after he was appointed by the government president in succession to Sir B. Brodie, and held that office until his death.

Having suffered in his later years from inherited gout, he had an acute seizure on 1 November 1863, and died in his house at Hadley on 13 December. According to his friend Sir John Simon, his last words were "Stopped.", referring to his own pulse 

His wife survived him; he had no issue. He was buried in a family vault (plot no.5039) on the western side of Highgate Cemetery, on the left hand side of the main path between Comfort's Corner and the Egyptian Avenue.

Works
Previous to 1820 he had published anonymously 'Outlines of a Course of Dissections,' and in that year he enlarged the book into his 'Dissector's Manual,' with plates, said to have been the first work of the same kind or scope yet published. He wrote no original memoirs except a minor piece in Med.-Chir. Trans. xii. 46.

Two of his Royal Academy lectures, on 'Beauty' and on 'Expression', were published in the Athenæum 16 and 23 December 1843.

The claims made by the Cooper family led to a quarrel. Green's part in it was a long pamphlet ('Letter to Sir Astley Cooper on the Establishment of an Anatomical and Surgical School at Guy's Hospital,' London, 1825), which stated the legal case.

He published, chiefly in The Lancet, a large number of lectures, clinical comments, and cases. In 1832 he gave the opening address (published) of the winter session, taking as his subject the functions or duties of the professions of divinity, law, and medicine according to Coleridge.

In the College of Surgeons he advocated reforms; the amended constitution of 1843, providing for a new class of fellows and the election of the council by the fellows, was in accord with his views published in a pamphlet in 1841 ('The Touchstone of Medical Reform'). He had already published two pamphlets on medical education and reform: 'Distinction without Separation: a Letter on the Present State of the Profession,' 1831, and 'Suggestions respecting Medical Reform,' 1834.

As Hunterian orator at the college in 1841 he gave before a distinguished audience an obscure address on 'Vital Dynamics,' an attempt to connect science with the philosophy of Coleridge. Re-appointed Hunterian orator in 1847, he supplemented his former Coleridgean exposition with another in the same vein on 'Mental Dynamics; or, Groundwork of a Professional Education.' He made little definite progress with the Coleridgean system; but before he died he compiled a work from Coleridge's marginalia, fragments, and recollected oral teaching, under the title 'Spiritual Philosophy, founded on the teaching of S. T. Coleridge,' which was brought out, in two volumes (1865), with a memoir of Green, by his friend and former pupil Sir John Simon. The first volume, of which the first chapter was dictated to Green by Coleridge himself, is occupied with a groundwork of principles; the second volume is theological.

References

External links

RCS page

Attribution

1791 births
1863 deaths
Burials at Highgate Cemetery
Medical doctors from London
19th-century English medical doctors
English surgeons
Fellows of the Royal Society
Samuel Taylor Coleridge
Monken Hadley